Christmas Together is the seventh studio album by American musical group The Piano Guys. Released on October 27, 2017, by Portrait (a division of Sony Masterworks), the album reached number 27 on the US Billboard 200. It also topped the Billboard Classical, New Age, and Holiday albums charts. The video for "Angels from the Realms of Glory" broke the largest live nativity world record, with 1,039 people attending.

Track listing

Personnel
The Piano Guys
Steven Sharp Nelson - Cellist/Songwriter
Jon Schmidt - Pianist/Songwriter/Additional vocals/Synth
Al van der Beek - Music Producer/Songwriter/Guitarist/Additional vocals
Paul Anderson - Video Producer/Videographer
Additional musicians
 Peter Hollens - vocals on "Angels from the Realms of Glory"
 David Archuleta - vocals on "Angels from the Realms of Glory"
 Mormon Tabernacle Choir - vocals on "Angels from the Realms of Glory" 
 Evynne Hollens - additional vocals on "Angels from the Realms of Glory" 
 Kristiana Sandberg, Kathryn Collier, Kathryn Leavitt, Sarah Crowther - violin on "Angels from the Realms of Glory"
 Candace Wagner, Emily Brown - viola on "Angels from the Realms of Glory"
 Kelly McConkie Stewart, Sarah Arnesen - additional cello on "Angels from the Realms of Glory"
 Ben Henderson - bass on "Angels from the Realms of Glory"
 Giles Reaves - percussion on "Angels from the Realms of Glory"
 Lexi Walker - lead vocals on O Holy Night / Ave Maria
 Chuck E. Myers - Additional vocals, additional bells & percussion on "Ode to Joy to the World"
 Kelly Wallis - orchestral percussion on "Ode to Joy to the World"
 Seretta Hart - trumpet on "Ode to Joy to the World"
 Debra Bonner Unity Gospel Choir - additional vocals on "Ode to Joy to the World"
 Wesley Bell Ringers - bells on "Ode to Joy to the World"
 Jake Bowen - additional vocals on "Ode to Joy to the World"
 Debra Bonner, Terry Waite - conducting on "Ode to Joy to the World"
 The King's Singers - lead vocals on "O Little One Sweet, BWV 493"
 Plácido Domingo - lead vocals on "Silent Night, Holy Night"
 Craig Aven - lead vocals on "The Sweetest Gift"

Charts

Weekly charts

Year end charts

See also 
 List of Billboard number-one holiday albums of the 2010s

References 

2017 classical albums
Sony Music Christmas albums
The Piano Guys albums
2017 Christmas albums
Christmas albums by American artists
Pop Christmas albums
Classical Christmas albums